Dear Mother is a 2020 French film written and directed by Laurent Lafitte. Lafitte also stars in the film, alongside Karin Viard and Vincent Macaigne. It was an official selection at the 2020 Cannes Film Festival.

Synopsis
While working out at the gym, forty-year-old lawyer Jean-Louis Bordier realizes that his heart has stopped beating. He no longer feels a pulse but remains conscious, managing to go about his regular activities without any noticeable difference. His best friend, veterinarian Michel, tries to help, without knowing what to do. Jean-Louis' wife, Valérie, consults her spiritual life coach for advice. The latter comes up with a creative but rather unconventional solution, involving Jean-Louis' mother.

Production
Laurent Lafitte, who had discovered the play L'Origine du monde by Sébastien Thiéry in 2013, announced the project in 2019 as his directorial debut. Lafitte initially planned to portray Michel's character, as he found him to be the funniest. Filming began on 3 June 2019, taking place in Paris and Île-de-France, and lasted eight weeks.

Release
In June 2019, it was announced that Dear Mother would be released in France on 11 November 2020. The film was scheduled to premiere at the 2020 Cannes Film Festival, which was canceled due to the COVID-19 pandemic. The French national release was set for 4 November 2020 but due to the closure of cinemas during the pandemic, it was postponed until 2021. Netflix released the film in North America in 2022.

Cast and characters

 Laurent Lafitte as Jean-Louis Bordier
 Karin Viard as Valérie Bordier
 Vincent Macaigne as Michel Verdoux
 Hélène Vincent as Brigitte Bordier
 Nicole Garcia as Margaux
 Pauline Clément as photocopy shop employee
 Luca Malinowski as trans woman
 Juliette Bettencourt as 16-year-old Valentine

 Charlotte Bienenfeld as Marie de la Rochène
 Christine Beauvallet as Valentine's mother
 Benoît DuPac as Valentine's father
 Cédric Leffray as 16-year-old Jean-Louis
 Pascal Lifschutz as Jean-Louis's father
 Jean-Claude Bohbote as Mr. Gillet
 Grégory Gaule as firefighter

References

External links
 
 

2020 films
2020 comedy films
French comedy films
Films shot in Paris
Films shot in Île-de-France
2020 directorial debut films
Films postponed due to the COVID-19 pandemic
2020s French films